American Park is a park in Mexico City's Polanco neighborhood, in Mexico.

Public art
The bust of Pedro Domingo Murillo and statue of Paul P. Harris are installed in the park.

The Monument to Christopher Columbus was expected to be placed in the park in 2022, after being removed in 2020 from its original spot at Paseo de la Reforma. Subsequently, it was decided that the statue would be relocated to the National Museum of the Viceroyalty, in Tepotzotlán, State of Mexico.

References

External links

 

Miguel Hidalgo, Mexico City
Parks in Mexico City
Polanco, Mexico City